Panama–Turkey relations are foreign relations between Panama and Turkey. Panama has an embassy in Ankara and a Consulate General in Istanbul since 2015. Turkey has an embassy in Panama City since March 1, 2014.

Official Visits

Economic Relations

Trade volume between the two countries was 260.9 million USD in 2018 (Turkish exports/imports: 248.8/12.1 million USD).

Resident diplomatic missions
 Panama has an embassy in Ankara.
 Turkey has an embassy in Panama City.

See also 
 Foreign relations of Panama
 Foreign relations of Turkey

References 

 
Turkey
Bilateral relations of Turkey